Star power may refer to:

StarPower (game), an educational game
"Starpower", a 1986 single by alternative rock band Sonic Youth
Star Power, a 2008 mixtape by rapper Wiz Khalifa
...And Star Power, a 2014 album by experimental rock duo Foxygen
Star Power, a gameplay element in the video game Guitar Hero
Star Power (TV series), a Filipino reality talent show
At Your Service-Star Power, a Filipino public service program
Alternative term for bankable star, an entertainer who is considered to be bankable

See also
 Power star (disambiguation)